Sergio Llamas Pardo (born 6 March 1993) is a Spanish professional footballer who plays as a midfielder for Real Unión.

Club career
Born in Vitoria-Gasteiz, Álava, Llamas finished his formation with Deportivo Alavés, and made his senior debuts with the reserves in the 2012–13 campaign. On 16 September 2012 he made his senior debut, coming on as a late substitute in a 1–0 win at CD Teruel.

On 20 August 2014 Llamas was definitely promoted to the main squad in Segunda División. Four days later he made his debut as a professional, starting in a 1–1 draw at CD Leganés.

On 18 March 2015 Llamas scored his first professional goal, netting the second in a 3–0 home win against CA Osasuna. He scored two goals in 19 appearances during the 2015–16 campaign, as his side achieved promotion to La Liga.

On 10 August 2016, Llamas signed a new three-year deal with the Basque side. The following 31 January, however, after failing to play a single minute during the first half of the campaign, he returned to the reserve side.

On 15 August 2017, Llamas was loaned to Segunda División B side Real Unión, for one year. The following 28 July he terminated his contract with Alavés.

On 5 February 2019, Llamas joined RoPs on a contract for the rest of 2019.

Honours
Alavés
Segunda División: 2015–16

References

External links

1993 births
Living people
Footballers from Vitoria-Gasteiz
Spanish footballers
Association football midfielders
Segunda División players
Segunda División B players
Tercera División players
Deportivo Alavés B players
Deportivo Alavés players
Real Unión footballers
Veikkausliiga players
Rovaniemen Palloseura players
Spanish expatriate footballers
Expatriate footballers in Finland
Spanish expatriate sportspeople in Finland
Primera Federación players